was a multi-member constituency of the House of Representatives in the Diet of Japan. It represented the city of Kobe from its establishment in 1947 until it was abolished as part of the electoral reform of 1994. Following the district's dissolution, Kobe is now represented by the single-member Hyogo 1st, 2nd and 3rd districts, while the Kita ward of the city forms part of the current Hyogo 4th district.

Ichiro Watanabe of the Komeito party was the longest-serving representative of the district, serving nine consecutive terms from 1967 until 1993. Hajime Ishii won eight elections in the district, seven as a Liberal Democratic candidate and once representing the Japan Renewal Party; he lost once as a LDP candidate in the 1983 general election.

In the district's final election, the five representatives were Akaba, Ishii, Ryuichi Doi (Democratic Socialist Party), Yuichi Takami (Japan New Party) and Hiromi Okazaki (independent). In the 1996 general election that followed the 1994 reforms, Ishii won the new Hyogo 1st district, Akaba defeated Takami in the 2nd district, and Doi defeated Okazaki in the 3rd district.

Elected Representatives 
Notes:
Representatives are not listed in order of polling
Party affiliations as of election day

References

Districts of the House of Representatives (Japan)